This is a list of Ministers of Internal Affairs of Russia.

Russian Empire

Provisional Government/Russian Republic

Russian SFSR

1917–1930

1955–1966

1989–1992

Russian Federation

See also
 Ministry of Internal Affairs
 Russian Council of Ministers
 Ministry of Police of Imperial Russia

External links
  Ministers of Imperial Russia

Lists
Interior
Lists of government ministers of Russia
Lists of government ministers of the Soviet Union